Kaylie Buck (born 20 February 2000) is a Canadian snowboarder who competes internationally in the alpine snowboard discipline.

Career
At the 2020 FIS Snowboarding Junior World Championships, Buck won bronze in the parallel giant slalom event, becoming the first Canadian woman to win an alpine medal at the event.

Buck has competed at two Senior World Championships in 2019 and 2021.

In January 2022, Buck was initially not named to Canada's 2022 Olympic team. However, after an appeal process, Buck along with three other snowboarders were added to the team in the parallel giant slalom event.

Buck finished 21st at the 2022 Olympic Games.

References

External links
 

2000 births
Living people
Sportspeople from Oakville, Ontario
Canadian female snowboarders
Snowboarders at the 2022 Winter Olympics
Olympic snowboarders of Canada